Art of War Undisputed Arena Fighting Championship: Art of War 3 was the third mixed martial arts event by the mixed martial arts organization Art of War Undisputed Arena Fighting Championship. The event took place on Saturday, September 1, 2007 at the American Airlines Center in Dallas, Texas.  The card aired on AXS TV (formerly HDNet). The television broadcast was produced by Allan Colton, Dustin Hodge, and John Jones.

History 
The fight card included Pedro Rizzo and Jeff Monson in the main event.  The show also featured a bout between Jorge Santiago and Jeremy Horn.

Results

References 

2007 in mixed martial arts
Mixed martial arts events
Mixed martial arts in Texas